By & Havn (English: City & Port) or Udviklingsselskabet By & Havn I/S (en.: The corporation for development of City and Port I/S) is an organisation, tasked with the development of Ørestad and the port of Copenhagen and the daily operations of the latter, which is done through a subsidiary, Copenhagen Malmö Port. By & Havn is owned by Copenhagen Municipality (55%) and the Danish government, through its ministry of transport (45%). Key areas of the organisation are Ørestad, Nordhavnen, Amerika Plads, Sluseholmen and Teglholmen. Currently the CEO is Anne Skovbro, while Pia Gjellerup serves as director of the board.

History 

The general partnership organisation, was established in October 2007, with the abolition of three organisations: Ørestadsselskabet I/S, Frederiksbergbaneselskabet I/S and Københavns Havn A/S. The headquarters was established in the old custom house at Nordre Toldbod. At the time of formation, the organisation was named  Arealudviklingsselskabet I/S, but on May 14, 2008, it was changed to By & Havn.

References 

Companies based in Copenhagen
Real estate companies of Denmark
Port of Copenhagen
Copenhagen Municipality
Danish companies established in 2007
Companies based in Copenhagen Municipality